Kool...Sakkath Hot Maga ( Cool...Very Hot Kid) is a 2011 Indian Kannada-language romance film starring Ganesh and Sana Khan. The film marks the directorial debut of Ganesh and Kannada acting debut of Sana Khan. His wife, Shilpa Ganesh produces this movie under the home banner 'Golden Movies'. V. Harikrishna has composed the music and a long associate, Ratnavelu works as the cameraman.

Plot
Rahul and Kajal are two college students, Rahul lives a carefree life with his friends and father. He meets Kajal at the college where they start off with enmity, but soon become friends and lovers. However, in Valentine's day Rahul is killed in a truck accident and dies leaving his father and Kajal devastated. Kajal is sent by her parents to Darjeeling to stay with her grandparents and recover herself. Kajal leaves for Darjeeling and is shell shocked to know her neighbour Manohar Jaranganalli (MJ), who is a music freak and a doppelganger of Rahul.

MJ meets Kajal and falls for her and enquires her about why she didn't met Rahul. Kajal reveals about Rahul's former friend Keerthi, whose brother had arrived at her house and revealed that Rahul betrayed Keerthi, to which Keerthi committed suicide, but Rahul had told her about Keerthi and was on her way to meet him, but she learned Rahul's accident, but was late and Rahul died. In a final twist is revealed that MJ is actually Rahul and reveals that he faked his death to know who is actual perpetrator behind his murder as the truck driver mentioned Kajal's name.

Rocky, Rahul's friend calls Rahul and tells that the perpetrator kidnapped Kajal. Rahul arrives and is knocked out by Rocky, who reveals himself as the mastermind behind his accident and also Keerthi's death. Rocky was in love with Keerthi, but she loved Rahul due to which Rocky killed her and makes it look like a suicide. He also loved Kajal, but realizing that Rahul would be hindrance to his love had planned to kill him and created Keerthi's brother (as Keerthi is an orphan). A fight ensues, in which Rocky falls to his death while attacking Rahul. Thus Rahul reunites with Kajal.

Cast
 Ganesh as Rahul and Manohar Jaraganalli (MJ) 
 Sana Khan as Kajal
 Rangayana Raghu
Deepa Shetty
 Sharan
 Mithra
 Dattanna as Kajal's grandfather
Sangeetha Shetty

Soundtrack

Reception 
Shruti Indira Lakshminarayana from Rediff.com scored the film at 2 out of 5 stars and says "Rathnavelu's camerawork adds charm to the song, as well as the second half of te film. Watch Kool if you must. And just like the film, the makers leave it to the audience to figure out why the film has been called so! Kool promised to come as a summer respite but instead adds to the heat". A critic from The New Indian Express wrote "The technical crew has done their job perfectly, but nothing can be recognised much because of a bad story. ‘Kool’ fails to bring in some cool breeze in this hot summer. At the most it is just an average affair". A critic from Bangalore Mirror wrote  "Ganesh attempts too many things in this film, making it a mess of everything.He sings, co-writes dialogues, gets his wife to produce the movie. Unwarranted and avoidable. Not Kool at all".

References

External links
 

2011 films
2010s Kannada-language films
Films scored by V. Harikrishna